Zaouli is a traditional dance of the Guro people (who speak the Guro language) of central Ivory Coast. The Zaouli mask, used in the dance, was created in the 1950s, reportedly inspired by a girl named "Djela Lou Zaouli" (meaning "Zaouli, daughter of Djela"). However, stories on the origins of the characteristic mask are varied, and each mask may have its own symbolic history. It was inscribed in 2017 on the Representative List of the Intangible Cultural Heritage of Humanity by UNESCO.

Each Guro village has a local Zaouli dancer (always male), performing during funerals and celebrations. The dance is believed to increase the productivity of the village that it is performed in and is seen as a tool of unity for the Guro community, and by extension the whole country.

In popular culture
The British-Sri Lankan rapper M.I.A. included a clip of a Zaouli dancer in her music video for the song "Warriors", released as part of the video Matahdatah Scroll 01: Broader Than A Border in 2015.

A popular video that includes the song "Bungee Jump" by electronic music artists Captain Hook & Astrix utilizes footage of Zaouli dancers.

In 2022, the K-pop girl group Nature released a music video for their single "Rica Rica", featuring choreography which is heavily inspired by Zaouli dance. Some internet users have criticised this use as inappropriate.

References

External links
 Zaouli de Manfla
 M.I.A. - Matahdatah Scroll 01 "Broader Than A Border"
 NATURE (네이처) - 'RICA RICA' MV

Ivorian culture
African dances